Cole Phillip Sanchez (born March 1, 1985) is an American artist, voice actor, writer, storyboard artist, director, and producer who is best known for being a writer, storyboard artist and director on the animated television series Adventure Time. Sanchez first rose to prominence when he became a storyboard artist of the Cartoon Network series The Marvelous Misadventures of Flapjack. Formerly, he was a supervising director on Long Live the Royals, and has since returned to Adventure Time to direct the last two seasons. He is currently supervising producer on the series Summer Camp Island.

Accolades
Sanchez's work on Adventure Time gained him a Primetime Emmy Award nomination for the fifth season episode "Simon & Marcy" in 2013, along with his then-storyboarding partner Rebecca Sugar.

Filmography

Television

References

External links

Living people
American television writers
American male television writers
American animators
American animated film directors
Cartoon Network Studios people
Place of birth missing (living people)
1985 births
Creative directors
American storyboard artists
American male voice actors